The 1975 Calder Cup playoffs of the American Hockey League began on April 2, 1975. The eight teams that qualified played best-of-seven series for Division Semifinals and Finals. The division champions played a best-of-seven series for the Calder Cup.  The Calder Cup Final ended on May 7, 1975, with the Springfield Indians defeating the New Haven Nighthawks four games to one to win the Calder Cup for the fourth time in team history.

Playoff seeds
After the 1974–75 AHL regular season, the top three teams from each division qualified for the playoffs. The Providence Reds finished the regular season with the best overall record.

Northern Division
Providence Reds - 98 points
Rochester Americans - 93 points
Nova Scotia Voyageurs - 89 points
Springfield Indians - 78 points
New Haven Nighthawks - 71 points (Played in the South division part of the bracket after beating Syracuse in a one game playoff.)

Southern Division
Virginia Wings - 75 points
Richmond Robins - 65 points
Hershey Bears - 64 points

Bracket

In each round, the higher seed receives home ice advantage, meaning they receive the "extra" game on home-ice if the series reaches the maximum number of games. There is no set series format due to arena scheduling conflicts and travel considerations.

Division Semifinals 
Note: Home team is listed first.

Northern Division

(N1) Providence Reds vs. (N4) Springfield Indians

(N2) Rochester Americans vs. (N3) Nova Scotia Voyageurs

Southern Division

(S1) Virginia Wings vs. (N5) New Haven Nighthawks

(S2) Richmond Robins vs. (S3) Hershey Bears

Division Finals

Northern Division

(N2) Rochester Americans vs. (N4) Springfield Indians

Southern Division

(S3) Hershey Bears vs. (N5) New Haven Nighthawks

Calder Cup Final

(N4) Springfield Indians vs. (N5) New Haven Nighthawks

See also
1974–75 AHL season
List of AHL seasons

References

Calder Cup
Calder Cup playoffs